Fusinus albacarinoides is a species of sea snail, a marine gastropod mollusc in the family Fasciolariidae, the spindle snails, the tulip snails and their allies.

Description
The length of the shell attains 18.5 mm.

Distribution
This species was found in the Gulf of Cadiz, off Portugal.

References

 Hadorn, R., Afonso, C., Rolàn, E., 2009. A new Fusinus (Gastropoda: Fasciolariidae) from the Algarve, south coast of Portugal. Iberus 27(1): 119-129

albacarinoides
Gastropods described in 2009